Tencent Games is the video game publishing division of Tencent Interactive Entertainment, itself a division of Tencent Holdings. It has five internal studio groups, including TiMi Studio Group. Tencent Games was founded in 2003 to focus on online games. In 2021, it launched its international Level Infinite brand, which is stated to be operated from its Singapore office.

History 
Tencent Games published its first game QQ Tang in 2004, which is based on its social media platform QQ. This was soon followed by QQ variant games such as Dungeon Fighter Online, a side-scrolling online beat 'em up game; QQ Fantasy, a 2D online game that incorporates elements from Chinese mythology; Xunxian, a 3D, online RPG; QQ Sanguo, an online casual role-playing game set during the Three Kingdoms period; QQ Huaxia, an online RPG; QQ Dancer, an online musical dancing game that offers QQ IM interactivity; QQ Nanaimo, an online game set on a desert island where players maintain houses and pets; QQ Speed, a casual online racing game; QQ R2Beat, an online in-line skating game; QQ Tang, an "advanced casual game" with gameplay derived from Chinese literature; QQ PET, and a QQ IM-based desktop virtual pet game. In August 2013, Tencent Games published Hi-Rez Studios's Smite in Mainland China.

Tencent gradually turned to mobile gaming in 2013. A game center with a sizable mobile game user base was launched by Mobile QQ and WeChat in the upcoming years. In order to become the biggest online gaming firm in the world, the company concentrated on the global gaming market, investing in or aggressively purchasing foreign game companies.

In 2015, Tencent Games published a multiplayer online battle arena game Honor of Kings exclusively for the Mainland China markets developed by the L1 division of TiMi Studio Group, and by 2017 was both the world's most popular and highest-grossing game of all time as well as the most downloaded app globally. Tencent Games also released, under the brand Level Infinite, an international version of Honor of Kings named Arena of Valor in 2017. In 2011, Tencent Games started hosting online multiplayer games such as Call of Duty Online, consisting of previous Call of Duty titles with added content, as well as the game League of Legends. Tencent Games partly owns battle royale games such as Fortnite and fully own Ring of Elysium.

Starting in 2016, Tencent Games developed a video gaming console dubbed TGP (Tencent Gaming Platform) Box. The TGP BOX is called the Blade. It is an Intel-powered console running Windows 10 and a TGP Box mode. So far, the TGP console has imported many Tencent games, such as League of Legends, FIFA Online 3, NBA 2K, Monster Hunter, Need for Speed, and PlayerUnknown's Battlegrounds. Tencent Games hopes to bring third-party developed games. On 22 November 2017, Tencent Games formally entered into a strategic co-operation with PUBG Studios and obtain exclusive rights to operate Playerunknown's Battlegrounds in China.

 In April 2017, Tencent Games unveiled its flagship gaming platform, WeGame which will host games, content, and services from all over the world and will provide gaming info, purchases, downloads, live streaming, and community services, creating an open ecosystem for gaming. WeGame is an upgraded version of TGP (Tencent Games Platform) that already has more than 200 million active users (compared to Steam's 125 million in 2015) and over 4.5 billion downloads. It will be dedicated to both global developers and players and will assist developers who require help with translation. The gaming platform will support both Chinese and global users through a single storefront and is due to go online on 1 September 2017, Tencent Games has stated that the platform will focus on PC and standalone games and will no longer host web or mobile games, and will provide support to small and indie companies. Aside from mainstream games, the company has promised to also launch titles which include Stardew Valley, Rocket League, Portal Knights, Minecraft, Cities: Skylines, with 170 games promised by the end of 2017.

Tencent Games plans to increase its advertising revenues through artificial intelligence and branded virtual costumes in its video games.

On 18 March 2019, Tencent announced that its subsidiary, TiMi Studio Group, would develop Activision's Call of Duty: Mobile. The game was released worldwide on 1 October 2019. As of 4 October 2019, the game has surpassed 35 million downloads and over $2 million in revenue.

PUBG Mobile and its Mainland China version topped the global mobile games chart by revenue, raking in a combined US$232 million of sales in March 2020, as many people turned to online entertainment during the COVID-19 pandemic. Honor of Kings is ranked as the second highest-earning game globally, generating US$112 million in revenue.

In July 2021, Tencent Games implemented a facial recognition system called "Midnight Patrol" in China to limit minors' access to games during curfew hours.

In December 2021, Tencent Games launched a new game publishing brand under Level Infinite, merging the Proxima Beta video games to this brand name. The focus of the brand is marketing, events, and esports for the video game studios of the Interactive Entertainment Group division. The area served is global and includes titles from subsidiaries that belong to the Interactive Entertainment Group or have a partnership which includes the developers TiMi Studio Group, LightSpeed Studios. Sharkmob, Mighty Kingdom, Fatshark, Shengqu Games, Next Studios, The Outsiders, 10 Chambers, and Funcom as of 8 December 2021. The Initial games published under the brand include Arena of Valor created by the TiMi-J6 development division of TiMi Studio Group, Synced developed by Next Studios, and Don't Starve: Newhome developed by Shengqu Games.

Divisions

Aurora Studio Group 
Launched in 2007, based in Shanghai. Games include Moonlight Blade, Iron Knight, Azure War: Name of the Nature, Light and Night.

LightSpeed Studios 
Launched in 2008, based in Shenzhen with the pre-fusion name Quantum Studios. The initial video games with the studio group release were QQ Huaxia & Freedom Fantasy.

In 2011, LightSpeed was founded; marking today's LightSpeed — Lightspeed & Quantum Studio Group brand name outside of Mainland China is LightSpeed Studios.

The following divisions belong to, were acquired or created within the LightSpeed Studios, and are classified as subsidiaries of LightSpeed Studios.

 LightSpeed LA — founded in 2020.
The first studio outside of Mainland China for LightSpeed Studios. The studio's office is in North America, Irvine. The studio director is Steve Martin. After the press releases, the subsidiary focuses on the first narrative-based, open-world IPs for an. unannounced 'next-gen console'.
 Uncapped Games — belong since 2021.
 S•Studio 
 Happy Studio — founded in 2014.
 TiKi Studios
 Anyplay Studio
 LightSpeed Tech Centre
 Art Monkey Gang
 Design Monkey Gang

Morefun Studios 
Launched in 2010, based in Shanghai. Games include: The Roco Kingdom, Naruto Online

NExT Studios 
Launched in 2017, based in Shanghai. Games include: Unheard, SYNCED: Off-Planet

TiMi Studio Group 

Launched in 2014, based in Shenzhen. Games include: Honor of Kings (Arena of Valor), QQ Speed, Call of Duty: Mobile

Tencent Institute of Games 
The Tencent Institute of Games was founded in 2016 as a company initiative to nurture talent and professional development, and promote knowledge sharing in the game industry. The division head is Xia Lin (Sammi). It has incubated games including Nishan Shaman and The Everlasting Regret. It cooperates with multiple universities and set up an enterprise college cooperative education model for game talent. The annual Tencent Games Developers Conference is held by this division.

List of games published under Level Infinite 

 Goddess of Victory: Nikke
 PUBG Mobile
 Tower of Fantasy (Licensed from Perfect World Games)

References

External links 
 
 Level Infinite

Tencent divisions and subsidiaries
Video game companies of China
Video game companies established in 2003
Chinese companies established in 2003
Companies based in Shenzhen